17th Politburo may refer to:
 17th Politburo of the Chinese Communist Party
 Politburo of the 17th Congress of the All-Union Communist Party (Bolsheviks)
 17th Politburo of the Communist Party of Czechoslovakia